Phantom Fantasia, later renamed Wicked Witches Haunt, was a dark ride opened in 1983 at Thorpe Park in Surrey, England. It took riders through a series of large animated horror scenes and illusions. The ride was designed by British attraction studio Sparks and the endless transit system manufactured by Mack Rides in Germany. The ride was refurbished with a UV treatment in 1994, renamed 'Wicked Witches Haunt'. It was demolished following a fire in 2000.

History
Phantom Fantasia was opened in 1983 as part of the Central Park area, Thorpe Park's first large development into a theme park. It was produced by Sparks in Colchester. The ride system was supplied my MACK rides and was an endless convoy 'doombuggy' system with clamshell-like hooded cars which rotated to show guests the ride's many Tableau. The ride featured many animated characters, including a hunchback swinging from a bone chandelier, a torture chamber run by evil puppet people, a ghoulish seance with a levitating table, a pit and the pendulum scene, Henry VIII dining at his banquet table while ghosts of his six wives appear and disappear around him (using a Pepper's ghost effect), a knights crypt, a long-legged horror climbing out a well, a Victorian street scene featuring Sweeney Todd and Mrs Lovett's shop windows (could you spot the pies with fingers sticking out them), a black magic necromancer brewing a potion with his familiars, two witches around a cauldron in their cave, Mary Queen of Scots holding her severed head in her arms, and a ballroom of eighteenth-century bewigged and costumed waltzing skeletons.

The ride was refurbished as Wicked Witches Haunt in 1994 with a scenic overhaul in UV. A number of witch animatronic figures added, a new soundtrack and a new final scene in a cobweb-filled dungeon featuring giant hairy spiders with ghoulish faces. On-ride photography was also added 

The attraction was destroyed by a large fire in 2000, the cause of which was never publicly announced.

References

External links
Full on-ride recording of Wicked Witches Haunt

1983 establishments in England
2000 disestablishments in England
Amusement rides introduced in 1983
Amusement rides that closed in 2000
Amusement rides manufactured by Mack Rides
Animatronic attractions
Buildings and structures in Surrey
Dark rides
Demolished buildings and structures in England
Haunted attractions (simulated)